Yoshihisa is a masculine Japanese given name.

Possible writings
Yoshihisa can be written using many different combinations of kanji characters. Here are some examples:

義久, "justice, long time"
義尚, "justice, still"
吉久, "good luck, long time"
吉尚, "good luck, still"
善久, "virtuous, long time"
善尚, "virtuous, still"
芳久, "virtuous/fragrant, long time"
芳尚, "virtuous/fragrant, still"
良久, "good, long time"
良尚, "good, still"
喜久, "rejoice, long time"
慶久, "congratulate, long time"
嘉久, "excellent, long time"

The name can also be written in hiragana よしひさ or katakana ヨシヒサ.

Notable people with the name
, Japanese warlord
, Japanese shōgun
, Japanese prince and general
, Japanese daimyō
, Japanese politician
, Japanese composer
, Japanese-born French composer
, Japanese baseball player
, Japanese politician
, Japanese shot putter and hammer thrower
, Japanese weightlifter
, Japanese baseball player
, Japanese scientist and engineer
 Yoshihisa Yamamoto (wrestler) (山本 宜久, born 1970), Japanese mixed martial artist and professional wrestler
, Japanese sport shooter

See also
Yoshihisa Station, a city tram station on the Takaoka Kidō Line located in Takaoka, Toyama Prefecture, Japan
Shin Yoshihisa Station, a city tram station on the Takaoka Kidō Line located in Takaoka, Toyama Prefecture, Japan

Japanese masculine given names